VirusProtectPro is a rogue malware program that claims to be a commercial anti-spyware, when in fact it is, itself, adware-advertised. The software installs itself, without consent, on the user's computers and registry. It then sends messages such as "System Error, Buy this software to fix" or "Your System is infected with spyware, buy VirusProtectPro to clean it", redirecting the user to VirusProtectPro's homepage where they are prompted to buy the VirusProtectPro software.

There are many variants of this rogue family including: AntiVirGear, SpywareStrike, SpyFalcon, SpywareQuake, MalwareWipe, Spylocked, SpyDawn.

External links 
Free & Easy Removal Process
Removal Instructions and Information
More Removal Instructions
Get Rid Of VirusProtectPro. Removal Method

References

Rogue software
Scareware